The SA postcode area, also known as the Swansea postcode area, is a group of 51 postcode districts for post towns Aberaeron, Ammanford, Boncath, Burry Port, Cardigan, Carmarthen, Clynderwen, Crymych, Ferryside, Fishguard, Glogue, Goodwick, Haverfordwest, Kidwelly, Kilgetty, Lampeter, Llanarth, Llandeilo, Llandovery, Llandysul, Llanelli, Llanfyrnach, Llangadog, Llangrannog, Llansaint, Llanwrda, Llanybydder, Milford Haven, Narberth, Neath, New Quay, Newcastle Emlyn, Newport, Pembroke, Pembroke Dock, Pencader, Pontardawe, Port Talbot, Saundersfoot, Swansea, Tenby and Whitland forming south-west Wales.



Coverage
The approximate coverage of the postcode districts:

|-
! SA1
| SWANSEA
| Bonymaen, Copper Quarter, Crymlyn Burrows, Danygraig, Greenhill, Hafod, Jersey Marine, Landore, Maritime Quarter, Mayhill, Mount Pleasant, Pentrechwyth, Port Tennant, St. Thomas, City Centre, Townhill, Waun Wen, Winch Wen, Winch Wen Industrial Estate
| Swansea
|-
! SA2
| SWANSEA
| Brynmill, Cockett, Derwen Fawr, Dunvant, Fairwood, Glanmor, Hendrefoilan, Hendrefoilan Student Village, Ilston, Killay, Sketty, Sketty Park, Singleton Park (University Campus), Tycoch, Uplands, Upper Killay
| Swansea
|-
! SA3
| SWANSEA
| Bishopston, Blackpill, Caswell, Clyne, Langland, Mumbles, Oystermouth, Southgate, South Gower, West Cross,
| Swansea
|-
! SA4
| SWANSEA
| Blue Anchor, Gorseinon, Gowerton, Hendy (Carmarthenshire), Loughor, North Gower, Penllergaer, Penclawdd, Pontarddulais, Three Crosses
| Swansea, Carmarthenshire
|-
! SA5
| SWANSEA
|Blaenymaes, Cwmdu, Cwmdu Industrial Estate, Felindre, Fforestfach, Gendros, Llangyfelach, Llewitha, Manselton, Penlan, Portmead, Tirdeunaw, Waunarlwydd
| Swansea
|-
! SA6
| SWANSEA
| Clase, Cwmrhydyceirw, Clydach, Morriston, Plasmarl, Plasmarl Industrial Estate, Swansea Enterprise Park, Ynystawe, Ynysforgan
| Swansea
|-
! SA7
| SWANSEA
| Birchgrove, Glais, Llansamlet, Swansea Enterprise Park, Talycoppa, Trallwn
| Swansea
|-
! SA8
| SWANSEA
| Alltwen, Cwmtawe, Pontardawe, Rhos, Rhyd-y-fro, Trebanos, Ynysmeudwy
| Neath Port Talbot
|-
! SA9
| SWANSEA
| Abercraf, Cefnbrynbrain, Cwmllynfell, Cwmtwrch, Lower Cwmtwrch, Rhiwfawr, Upper Cwmtwrch, Ystalyfera, Ystradgynlais, Ystradowen
| Neath Port Talbot, Powys, Carmarthenshire
|-
! SA10
| NEATH
| Aberdulais, Bryncoch, Cadoxton, Caewern, Coed Darcy, Coelbren, Crynant, Jersey Marine, Llandarcy, Neath Abbey, Onllwyn, Seven Sisters, Skewen
| Neath Port Talbot, Powys
|-
! SA11
| NEATH
| Blaengwrach, Briton Ferry, Cimla, Glynneath, Neath town centre, Pontneddfechan, Resolven, Tonmawr, Tonna
| Neath Port Talbot, Powys
|-
! SA12
| PORT TALBOT
| Aberafan, Aberavon, Baglan, Cwmafan, Port Talbot town centre, Sandfields,
| Neath Port Talbot
|-
! SA13
| PORT TALBOT
| Bryn, Cymmer, Margam, Taibach
| Neath Port Talbot
|-
! SA14
| LLANELLI
| Llanelli (east), Bynea, Dafen
| Carmarthenshire
|-
! SA15
| LLANELLI
| Llanelli (west and town centre), Felinfoel, Pontyates
| Carmarthenshire
|-
! SA16
| BURRY PORT
| Burry Port, Pembrey
| Carmarthenshire
|-
! SA17
| FERRYSIDE
| Ferryside, Trimsaran
| Carmarthenshire
|-
! SA17
| KIDWELLY
| Kidwelly, Llansaint, Mynyddygarreg, Carway
| Carmarthenshire
|-
! SA18
| AMMANFORD
| Ammanford, Betws, Garnswllt, Gwaun-Cae-Gurwen, Lower Brynamman, Upper Brynamman
| Carmarthenshire, Neath Port Talbot, Swansea
|-
! rowspan=3 |SA19 
| LLANDEILO
| Llandeilo
| Carmarthenshire
|-
| LLANGADOG
| Llangadog
| Carmarthenshire
|-
| LLANWRDA
| Llanwrda
| Carmarthenshire
|-
! SA20
| LLANDOVERY
| Llandovery
| Carmarthenshire
|-
! SA31
| CARMARTHEN
| Carmarthen town centre, Cwmffrwd
| Carmarthenshire
|-
! SA32
| CARMARTHEN
| Nantgaredig, Dryslwyn, Porthyrhyd, Llangathen
| Carmarthenshire
|-
! SA33
| CARMARTHEN
| Bancyfelin, Pendine, Blaenycoed, St Clears
| Carmarthenshire
|-
! SA34
| WHITLAND
| Whitland, Tavernspite
| Carmarthenshire, Pembrokeshire
|-
! SA35
| LLANFYRNACH
| Llanfyrnach
| Pembrokeshire
|-
! SA36
| GLOGUE
| Glogue, Hermon
| Pembrokeshire
|-
! SA37
| BONCATH
| Boncath, Blaenffos
| Pembrokeshire
|-
! SA38
| NEWCASTLE EMLYN
| Newcastle Emlyn
| Carmarthenshire, Ceredigion, Pembrokeshire
|-
! SA39
| PENCADER
| Pencader, Llanfihangel-ar-Arth, Llanllwni
| Carmarthenshire, Ceredigion
|-
! SA40
| LLANYBYDDER
| Llanybydder, Llanwenog, Gorsgoch
| Carmarthenshire, Ceredigion
|-
! SA41
| CRYMYCH
| Crymych, Eglwyswrw
| Pembrokeshire
|-
! SA42
| NEWPORT
| Newport, Dinas Cross
| Pembrokeshire
|-
! SA43
| CARDIGAN
| Cardigan, Cilgerran, St Dogmaels
| Ceredigion, Pembrokeshire
|-
! SA44
| LLANDYSUL
| Llandysul, Dre-fach Felindre, Pentrecwrt
| Ceredigion, Carmarthenshire
|-
! SA45
| NEW QUAY
| New Quay
| Ceredigion
|-
! SA46
| ABERAERON
| Aberaeron
| Ceredigion
|-
! SA47
| LLANARTH
| Llanarth
| Ceredigion
|-
! SA48
| LAMPETER
| Lampeter, Cwmann
| Ceredigion, Carmarthenshire
|-
! style="background:#FFFFFF;"|SA48
| style="background:#FFFFFF;"|ABERAERON
| style="background:#FFFFFF;"|
| style="background:#FFFFFF;"|non-geographic
|-
! SA61
| HAVERFORDWEST
| Haverfordwest town centre, Merlin's Bridge
| Pembrokeshire
|-
! SA62
| HAVERFORDWEST
| St Davids, Johnston
| Pembrokeshire
|-
! SA63
| CLARBESTON ROAD
| Clarbeston
| Pembrokeshire
|-
! SA64
| GOODWICK
| Goodwick
| Pembrokeshire
|-
! SA65
| FISHGUARD
| Fishguard, Cwm Gwaun
| Pembrokeshire
|-
! SA66
| CLYNDERWEN
| Clynderwen, Efailwen
| Pembrokeshire, Carmarthenshire
|-
! SA67
| NARBERTH
| Narberth
| Pembrokeshire
|-
! SA68
| KILGETTY
| Kilgetty
| Pembrokeshire
|-
! SA69
| SAUNDERSFOOT
| Saundersfoot
| Pembrokeshire
|-
! SA70
| TENBY
| Tenby, Penally
| Pembrokeshire
|-
! SA71
| PEMBROKE
| Pembroke
| Pembrokeshire
|-
! style="background:#FFFFFF;"|SA72
| style="background:#FFFFFF;"|PEMBROKE
| style="background:#FFFFFF;"|
| style="background:#FFFFFF;"|non-geographic
|-
! SA72
| PEMBROKE DOCK
| Pembroke Dock
| Pembrokeshire
|-
! SA73
| MILFORD HAVEN
| Milford Haven
| Pembrokeshire
|-
! style="background:#FFFFFF;"|SA80
| style="background:#FFFFFF;"|SWANSEA
| style="background:#FFFFFF;"|Department for Work and Pensions
| style="background:#FFFFFF;"|non-geographic
|-
! style="background:#FFFFFF;"|SA99
| style="background:#FFFFFF;"|SWANSEA
| style="background:#FFFFFF;"|Driver and Vehicle Licensing Agency
| style="background:#FFFFFF;"|non-geographic
|}

Map

See also
Postcode Address File
List of postcode areas in the United Kingdom

References

External links
Royal Mail's Postcode Address File
A quick introduction to Royal Mail's Postcode Address File (PAF)
Using Welsh alternative addresses within Royal Mail's Postcode Address File (PAF)

Postcode areas covering Wales